Air Board may refer to:

 Air Board (Australia), the controlling body of the Royal Australian Air Force from 1921 to 1976
 Air Board (Canada), Canada's first governing body for aviation from 1919 to 1923
 Air Board (United Kingdom), 1916-1917

See also
 Air Force Board, UK, from 1964